Limbdi State was a princely state and was entitled to a 9-gun salute during the British Raj. It was ruled at that time by members of the Jhala dynasty. It belonged to Kathiawar Agency. After India's independence from British colonial rule in 1947, Limbdi was integrated into the Indian Union with other princely states.

History 
During local princely states existence in Kathiyawad, there were approximately 222 small & medium princely states. During that era, Limbdi was also a princely state. During the time span from 1768 to 1948, many rulers had taken charge of Limbdi starting from Harisinhji, Bhojrajji, Harbhamji, Fatesinhji, Jashwantsinhji, Jatashankar.

Rulers
The rulers of Limbdi had the title of Thakur Sahib. They also held the title of Maharana, which was rarely used.
16.. – 17..                Verisalji I Aderajj
17.. – 17..                Askaranji III Verisalji  
17.. – 17..                Aderajji II Askaranji 
17.. – 17..                Verisalji II Aderajji 
17.. – 1786                Harbhanji I Verisalji              (d. 1786) 
1786 – 1825                Harisinhji Harbhanj                (d. 1825)
1825 – 1837                Bhojraji Harisinhji                (d. 1837)
1837 –  8 Jan 1856         Harbhamji II Bhojraji              (d. 1856) 
 8 Jan 1856 – 30 Jan 1862  Fatehsinhji Bhojraji               (d. 1862)
30 Jan 1862 – 26 Apr 1907  Jashwantsinhji Fatehsinhji         (b. 1859 – d. 1907) (from 30 Jun 1887, Sir Jashwantsinhji Fatehsinhji)
30 Jan 1862 –  1 Aug 1877  Rani Shri Hariba Kunverba - Sahiba (f) -Regent
26 Apr 1907 – 30 Sep 1940  Daulatsinhji Jashwantsinhji        (b. 1868 – d. 1940) (from 1 Jan 1921, Sir Daulatsinhji Jashwantsinhji)
30 Sep 1940 –  6 Jan 1941  Digvijaysinhji Daulatsinhji        (b. 1896 – d. 1941) 
6 Jan 1941 – 15 Aug 1947  Chhatarsalji Digvijaysinhji        (b. 1940 – d. 2020)

References

External links

Princely states of Gujarat
Kathiawar Agency
Surendranagar district
States and territories established in the 16th century
16th-century establishments in India
1947 disestablishments in India